During its first three years of existence, Paris Saint-Germain Football Club were fan-owned and had 20,000 members. The club was run by board members Guy Crescent, Pierre-Étienne Guyot and Henri Patrelle. A group of wealthy French businessmen, led by Daniel Hechter and Francis Borelli, would then buy the club in 1973. PSG changed hands in 1991, when Canal+ took over, and then again in 2006, with the arrival of Colony Capital. Tamim bin Hamad Al Thani, the Emir of Qatar, has been PSG's owner since 2011 through Qatar Sports Investments (QSI).

QSI acquired a majority stake in June 2011 and then became the club's sole owner in March 2012. This means PSG are a state-owned club, the only of its kind, and thus one of the richest teams in the world. QSI chairman Nasser Al-Khelaifi has been PSG president since the takeover. Al Thani, however, has the final word on every major decision of the club. He is both the chairman of the QIA and the founder of QSI.

Upon its arrival, QSI pledged to form a team capable of winning the UEFA Champions League. PSG have spent over €1.3bn on player transfers since the summer of 2011. These massive expenditures have translated in PSG's domination of French football but have not yet brought home the coveted UCL trophy as well as causing problems with UEFA's Financial Fair Play regulations.

PSG currently have the fifth-highest revenue in the footballing world with an annual revenue of €654m according to Deloitte, and are the world's seventh-most valuable football club, worth $3.2bn according to Forbes. PSG's strong financial position has been sustained by the club's Qatari owners; the team's on-pitch success; high-profile signings, including Zlatan Ibrahimović, Neymar, Kylian Mbappé and Lionel Messi; and lucrative sponsorship deals with the Qatar Tourism Authority, Nike, Air Jordan, Accor and Qatar Airways.

History

From Hechter to Borelli (1970–1991)

Developing football in Paris was a great ambition in 1969, since the French capital did not have an elite football team. Main backers Guy Crescent, Pierre-Étienne Guyot and Henri Patrelle were stuck with a problem related to the financing of the project until they met Real Madrid president Santiago Bernabéu. The latter told them that starting a subscription campaign was the best solution. After 20,000 subscriptions, Paris Saint-Germain were founded on 12 August 1970. For the first time in French football history, the fans had financially contributed to the creation of a football club.

During its first three years of existence, the club was fan-owned and had 20,000 members. At the time, the annual fee to become a member was between 25 and 40 francs (between 4 and 6 euros). PSG were run by board members Crescent, Guyot and Patrelle until 1973. That year, PSG accrued a considerable debt and PSG president Patrelle set out to look for financial aid. He found it in the form of French investor and fashion designer Daniel Hechter. The latter took control of Paris Saint-Germain shortly after, becoming club president and naming fellow Frenchman Francis Borelli as vice-president. Borelli then assumed the presidency in 1978 after Hechter was banned for life from football by the French Football Federation (FFF). He was found guilty of running a ticketing scheme at the Parc des Princes.

PSG's first major trophies arrived during the tenure of Borelli, but he also left the club on the brink of insolvency. Bought by French conglomerate Matra, the resurgent Matra Racing reached the top-flight in 1984 and went head to head with PSG for recognition as the capital's main sporting entity. Matra's experiment was short-lived, though, and by 1989 they returned to the lower leagues after bankrupting themselves. Borelli, however, incurred serious debts and financial irregularities in an attempt to ensure PSG's dominance in Paris. His mismanagement came to light in 1991 and, like Hechter before him, was forced by the FFF to resign.

Canal+ and Colony Capital (1991–2011)

Eager to revive interest in Ligue 1 and lure more subscribers, French premium television channel Canal+ bought PSG in May 1991. Canal+ paid off the club's debt and saved it from bankruptcy. Televised games became PSG's main source of income during a decade in which TV rights skyrocketed. As a result, PSG became one of the richest clubs in France. The club's budget went from 90 to 120 million francs and star signings like Valdo, David Ginola, George Weah, Raí and Youri Djorkaeff ensured several trophies between 1993 and 1998.

PSG adopted the status of Société Anonyme Sportive Professionnelle (SASP, i.e., professional sport limited company). Canal+ became the majority shareholder in 1997 (56.7%) and then sole owner in 2005 after buying out the Association Paris Saint-Germain (34%) and historical club leaders Alain Cayzac, Bernard Brochand and Charles Talar (9.3%). The management of the club fell into the hands of several delegated presidents; Michel Denisot was the first and, by far, the most successful.

Between 1991 and 1998, PSG president Michel Denisot ensured the club's financial health aided by the team's sporting success and increased broadcasting revenues. The departure of Denisot at the end of the 1997–98 season marked a downturn in the club's fortunes. PSG struggled on the pitch and also began to accumulate debt off of it. Despite recapitalizing the club in 2004, it just kept rising. In the time period of 2004–2006, PSG were the only French club with a large amount of debt. Fortunately, this was somewhat helped by an increase in the club's turnover. Led by players such as Marco Simone, Ronaldinho and Pauleta five more trophies arrived between 1998 and 2010, but PSG's on-field form slowly declined. The club even spent two seasons staving off relegations that were only very narrowly avoided.

Eventually, a split from Canal+ became inevitable. In May 2006, Canal+ sold the club to investment firms Colony Capital, Butler Capital Partners and Morgan Stanley for €41m. Colony would go on to buy the majority of shares between 2008 and 2009, becoming 95% owners of the club. Butler retained a 5% stake. After considerably reducing losses, Colony sent out a message in 2010, stating that they were looking for new investors to help make PSG a title contender in the coming years.

Qatar Sports Investments (2011–present)

Qatari takeover

Paris Saint-Germain finally restored balance in June 2011, when Tamim bin Hamad Al Thani, the Emir of Qatar, bought 70% of the club's shares through state-run shareholding organization Qatar Sports Investments (QSI), a subsidiary of Qatar Investment Authority (QIA), the country's sovereign wealth fund. Colony Capital (29%) and Butler (1%) remained minority shareholders. Al Thani immediately named QSI chairman Nasser Al-Khelaifi as club president after the takeover. Every major decision goes through Al-Khelaifi first, but Al Thani has the final word. In March 2012, QSI purchased the remaining 30% stake to become PSG's sole shareholder, valuing the club at €100m.

Al Thani established QSI in 2005 and is also the chairman of the board of directors of QSI's parent company QIA. He has used the country's oil money to financially back the Parisian club through QSI, the QIA and other state-run companies like the Qatar Tourism Authority (QTA), the Qatar National Bank (QNB) and Ooredoo. PSG are therefore a state-owned club, which makes them one of the wealthiest teams in the world.

The strategy behind Qatar's buyout of PSG was presenting a worldwide image of itself as a great footballing nation before it stages the 2022 FIFA World Cup. In November 2010, right before the vote, UEFA president Michel Platini met with French president Nicolas Sarkozy, the emir of Qatar Al Thani, and the Qatari prime minister. Sarkozy is a well-known supporter of PSG, which were then struggling financially under Colony Capital. After that meeting, Platini changed his voting intention, from the US to Qatar, and six months later QSI bought PSG.

PSG went from Ligue 1 strugglers to one of Europe's elite clubs and UEFA Champions League contenders, with the club's Qatari owners splashing out over €1b on players. Since 2011 the club has dominated French football, but the Champions League has so far remained elusive. PSG's massive expenditures have also brought the club several problems with UEFA and its Financial Fair Play regulations (FFP).

First UEFA investigation

In August 2012, PSG signed a huge nation branding deal with the Qatar Tourism Authority (QTA) to promote Qatar. The Qatari government branch agreed to pay PSG €1b over five seasons, including €100m for the first season. The partnership was made official in October 2013, but the contract stipulated two retroactive payments of €100m and €200m for the 2011–12 and 2012–13 seasons, respectively, thus wiping their losses for that period.

New signings Thiago Silva, Zlatan Ibrahimović, Edinson Cavani and David Luiz arrived at the club, though not without consequences. In October 2013, UEFA determined that the QTA deal — worth €200m per year and conveniently backdated to cover 2012 — was struck at an artificially-inflated price to help PSG get around UEFA Financial Fair Play Regulations (FFP), which aim to stop clubs spending more than they earn.

In consequence, UEFA's Club Financial Control Body (CFCB) halved the value of the deal from €200m to €100m in April 2014. UEFA's revised valuation saw PSG's deficit for the 2013–14 season reach €107m — more than double the amount allowed under FFP rules, which limit losses to €45m over the last two years. Inevitably, UEFA punished PSG for violating FFP rules in May 2014. FFP sanctions notably included a €60m fine, amongst other sporting and financial measures. In September 2015, UEFA lifted the restrictions imposed on the Parisian club. In August 2016, PSG and the QTA renewed their partnership until June 2019, after their initial four-year contract expired in June 2016.

Second UEFA investigation

In August 2017, PSG activated the €222m release clause of Barcelona player Neymar, making him the most expensive transfer in football history. Later that month, Kylian Mbappé joined PSG from Monaco on loan with option to buy for €180m divided into three installments. He became the second-most expensive player in the world when the deal was completed in May 2022.

UEFA subsequently opened a new Financial Fair Play (FFP) investigation into PSG. In June 2018, UEFA cleared the club of breaching FFP rules, but devalued its Qatar-based deals with the Qatar Tourism Authority (QTA), the Qatar National Bank (QNB) and Ooredoo. The QTA contract went from €100m to €58m. UEFA also warned PSG that the QTA contract would not be taken into account beyond June 2019. The club also brought in the €50 million in player sales that UEFA demanded before the end of June 2018 to adjust to FFP.

PSG appealed to the Court of Arbitration for Sport (CAS) in November 2018. A few days later, UEFA temporarily suspended the investigation until CAS gives its judgment regarding PSG's appeal. In March 2019, the CAS upheld PSG's appeal against UEFA regarding FFP. This meant that UEFA's original decision back in June 2018 was final, so PSG avoided FFP sanctions for 2015, 2016 and up until the summer of 2017. The French outfit also satisfied the €60m requirement in player sales set by UEFA before the end of June 2019.

Change of business model

Under pressure from UEFA, the club did not renew their controversial seven-year nation branding agreement with the Qatar Tourism Authority (QTA) when it expired in June 2019, embarking in the process of building a new business model to pursue the goal of economic emancipation from its Qatari owners. Deprived of their most lucrative partner since the Qatari takeover, PSG relied on their contracts with French multinational Accor (€65m/year), as well as American brands Nike (€80m/year) and Air Jordan (€67m/year), between 2019 and 2022.

The club's deals with Qatar have nevertheless continued via more classical collaborations in accordance with UEFA's FFP rules. Following Accor's stint (2019–2022), Qatar Airways became PSG's new shirt sponsor by agreeing to a multi-year deal in June 2022 (€70m/year). The QTA, the Qatar National Bank (QNB), Aspetar, beIN Sports and Ooredoo also pay around €10m a year each to be premium partners of the club. Ooredoo notably has the naming rights of the Camp des Loges, PSG's training facilities, now officially named Ooredoo Training Centre.

As with the QTA, the club also has a nation branding agreement with the Rwandan government to promote Rwanda. The latter pay €10m a year (2019–2022) for branding on the player's warm-up jerseys and LED perimeter board signage around PSG's stadium to advertise their tourist board's message "Visit Rwanda." Another notable non-Qatari based deal is that of American online lifestyle company GOAT, which pays €17m a year (2022–2025) for its logo to appear on the sleeves of the team's shirt.

Financial status

Overview

Paris Saint-Germain recorded a profit of 1.5m francs during their inaugural 1970–71 season, but this trend quickly reversed and the club's debt grew over the years. PSG were in severe financial trouble by the early 1990s, having indebted itself for 50 million francs, which the Paris City Council refused to pay. Fortunately, Canal+ bought the club in May 1991 and wiped it out. With 40% of its income coming from televised games, PSG became one of the richest clubs in France.

In the time period of 1991–1998, the capital club were in good financial health thanks to the increase in TV rights, the team's excellent sporting performances and the rise in attendance at the Parc des Princes. PSG also opened its first official store at the prestigious Champs-Élysées avenue in May 1998, and debuted in the top 20 of the Deloitte Football Money League in 1997–98, being ranked 15th with a total revenue of €39m. That season, however, marked the end of the club's golden age; PSG went into financial and sporting decline, and fell right off the list in 1998–99.

PSG recorded a negative net income every season between 1998 and 2011, with losses amounting to nearly €300m: €240m under Canal+'s ownership and €58m more with Colony Capital. At the time, the club had a total revenue of €101m and was valued at €100m. This all changed when Tamim bin Hamad Al Thani, the Emir of Qatar, bought PSG through Qatar Sports Investments (QSI) in June 2011. The QSI deal covered €15–20m in debt and €19m in losses from the 2010–11 season. Owned by the state of Qatar itself (annual GDP $100bn), PSG became one of the world's wealthiest clubs.

Following the takeover, ahead of the 2011–12 campaign, QSI chairman and new PSG president Nasser Al-Khelaifi announced plans of making the club profitable again, a feat not seen since the tenure of Michel Denisot in the 1990s. Al-Khelaifi entrusted this task to deputy general manager Jean-Claude Blanc. PSG immediately returned to the Deloitte Football Money League that season, securing tenth place with a total revenue of €221m. Five years later, PSG turned a profit of €11m during the 2014–15 season. The club also recorded a positive net income in 2015–16, 2017–18 and 2018–19. PSG, however, suffered a major setback in the following two campaigns. Disrupted by the COVID-19 pandemic and its impact on football, with games played behind closed doors, the club registered record loses to the tune of €124m in 2019–20 and €224m in 2020–21.

PSG currently have the fifth-highest revenue in the footballing world with an annual revenue of €654m according to Deloitte, and are the world's seventh-most valuable football club, worth $3.2bn according to Forbes. This financial growth has been supported by the club's Qatari owners; the team's on-pitch success; high-profile signings, including Zlatan Ibrahimović, Neymar, Kylian Mbappé and Lionel Messi; and big-money partnerships with the Qatar Tourism Authority, Nike, Air Jordan, Accor and Qatar Airways.

Shirt sponsor

Paris Saint-Germain played without a shirt sponsor until the 1972–73 season, when the club signed a deal with Canadian grocery store chain Montreal. PSG then signed with Canadian soft-drink brand Canada Dry in 1973–74 what was the biggest contract in Division 2 history at the time. The club also reached an agreement with French radio RTL worth 1.2m francs on the condition of reaching the top flight in 1974–75. PSG ultimately did and the RTL partnership lasted until 1990–91.

Between 1986 and 1995, the club had two sponsors or more in its shirts. Brands from this period included RTL, French premium television channel Canal+, French television network La Cinq, Japanese electronics company TDK, French eyewear brand Alain Afflelou, American electronics manufacturer Commodore, German dairy company Müller, French soft-drink brand Tourtel, Spanish car manufacturer SEAT, and British tea brand Lipton. German automobile manufacturer Opel marked the end of this trend in the 1995–1996 season, assuming shirt sponsorship duties until 2001–02. Next was French multimedia company Thomson from 2002 to 2006 before turning to Dubai-based airline Fly Emirates.

Emirates appeared on the shirts until the 2018–19 season, after which French hospitality company Accor took over as shirt sponsor. Its lifestyle loyalty platform, Accor Live Limitless (ALL), was on the front of the shirts between 2019 and 2022. Accor reportedly paid the club around €65m each year. The agreement was almost double the figure that Emirates paid PSG, which was approximately €25m per year. Qatari airline Qatar Airways replaced Accor in June 2022. The multi-year contract will see PSG receive close to €70m every season.

Kit manufacturer

French sportswear brand Le Coq Sportif became the first kit manufacturer of Paris Saint-Germain in 1970. They have assumed kit supply duties in three occasions: from 1970 until 1975, for the 1976–1977 campaign, and between 1978 and 1986. In between, French sportswear brand Kopa, created by French footballer Raymond Kopa, and American sportswear brand Pony briefly took charge of the kits for the 1975–1976 and 1977–78 seasons, respectively. German sportswear brand Adidas became the kit supplier in 1986 and the partnership lasted until 1989.

PSG signed with American sportswear brand Nike ahead of the 1989–90 season. The deal was renewed until the end of the 2021–22 campaign in December 2013. Nike increased the €6.5m annual commitment it had with the club to €25m. In late June 2019, PSG announced a long-term contract extension with Nike, which is now one of European football's most lucrative and the biggest sponsorship agreement in the club's history. The Parisians are now tied to the Swoosh company until 2032 with an annual figure of €80 million. The new deal covers the men's and women's football teams as well as their handball outfit.

In September 2018, before the start of the 2018–19 season, PSG signed a partnership with Nike-owned basketball brand Air Jordan for it to produce some of the club's kits until 2021. The contract, worth around €67m a year, was extended until 2022 in January 2021, even though it was not made official by the club. The 2021–22 home shirt was the first to bear the Jordan logo after previously only making away, third and fourth strips for the club. In February 2022, despite no formal announcement, the deal was prolonged for another season, until 2023.

Transfer activity

Before QSI

Dogliani, the original transfer record

Paris Saint-Germain have spent over €1.3bn on players since Qatar Sports Investments arrived ahead of the 2011–12 season. The Parisians are not new to lavish transfers, though. Bankrolled by wealthy club presidents Daniel Hechter and Francis Borelli in the 1970s and 1980s, PSG made Jean-Pierre Dogliani the club's original transfer record in summer 1973. Hechter, who had recently arrived as a major stakeholder at PSG, handed Monaco €10k for the French playmaker. Congolese attacker François M'Pelé quickly dethroned Dogliani in December 1973, signing from Ajaccio for €130k, as Hechter broke the bank again.

After becoming club president in June 1974, Hechter signed Algerian virtuoso Mustapha Dahleb, considered PSG's first star and for which they paid a then French record €205k to Sedan. A year later, PSG shelled out that same amount to snatch Humberto Coelho from Benfica. The Portuguese became the club's record sale when he went back to Benfica for €107k in 1977. Next up was Carlos Bianchi that same year, whose price tag made him the club's most expensive player yet. The Argentine marksman arrived at the Parc des Princes from Reims for €230k. It was Hechter's final signing as PSG president. His right-hand man, club vice-president Francis Borelli, succeeded him. 

When Bianchi left in 1979 to join Strasbourg for €230k, he also became PSG's most valuable sale up until that point. He was eventually surpassed by Yugoslavian winger Ivica Šurjak, sold for €460k to Udinese in 1982. Borelli continued his predecessor's transfer policy, breaking the club's transfer record in 1979 with the capture of Portuguese wizard João Alves from Benfica for €760k. Jules Bocandé nearly doubled this figure in 1986, when PSG recruited him for €1.5m from Metz. The Senegalese held this record until 1991 and the arrival of Canal+ as club owners.

Anelka and Ronaldinho

Paris Saint-Germain also made waves in the transfer market during the 1990s and early 2000s. Backed by French TV giants Canal+, who bought the club in May 1991, PSG completely smashed its two transfer records ahead of the 1991–92 season. Brazil international Ricardo arrived from Benfica for €4.6m and French right back Jocelyn Angloma joined arch-rivals Marseille for €6m. Both marks were topped by Liberian striker George Weah. The Parisian club dished out €6.5m to lure him out of Monaco in 1992 and then sold him for €6.9m to Milan three years later.

The spending spree continued with French prodigy Florian Maurice, who for €7m became the most expensive transfer in France when he joined the capital side from Lyon in 1997. PSG did not slow down and broke the national transfer record yet again. Not once, but twice. The club signed Nigerian genius Jay-Jay Okocha from Fenerbahçe for €12.4m in 1998 and then paid Real Madrid €34.5m for the return of prodigal son Nicolas Anelka in 2000. Anelka would remain PSG's record purchase until the Qatar Sports Investments era.

In the sales department, things speeded up as well. Brazilian winger Leonardo, who arrived to the club from Japan without making much noise in 1996, was sold for €8.5m to Milan the following year, becoming the club's most expensive sale. The record however, did not stand for long, with French free-kick specialist Laurent Robert joining Newcastle United for €14.33m in 2001, followed by Anelka's €15m move to Manchester City in 2002, and finally by Ronaldinho, whose switch to Barcelona for €32.25m in 2003 stood as the club's priciest sale until 2016.

After QSI

Initial years

Following their takeover by Qatar Sports Investments (QSI) in June 2011, Paris Saint-Germain broke the French transfer record with the purchase of Argentine playmaker Javier Pastore from Palermo for €42m that summer. This fee was matched by Thiago Silva, who was signed from A.C.Milan in 2012, and then eclipsed by the €64.5m capture of Edinson Cavani from S.S.C. Napoli in 2013. The club also spent heavily on several other stars, including Zlatan Ibrahimović (€21m), David Luiz (€49.5m) and Ángel Di María (€63m). On the other hand, David Luiz and Gonçalo Guedes were also sold for large transfer fees thus surpassing Ronaldinho at the top of PSG's most expensive sales. Chelsea paid €35m for David Luiz on deadline day of the winter transfer window in 2016, while Valencia C.F. acquired Guedes for €40m during the summer transfer window in 2018.

Marquee Signings, Neymar and Mbappé

Cavani was replaced in August 2017, when Paris Saint-Germain paid another transfer fee that broke the  world transfer record. Dubbed by media outlets as “the transfer of the century,” Brazil forward Neymar became the world's most expensive player when PSG activated his €222m release clause to snatch him from Barcelona. Later that month, young French forward Kylian Mbappé joined from Monaco on a deal that was initially a  loan, which included a clause for a  permanent transfer, this divided the payments for said transfer into three installments. PSG paid €90m the following summer, and €55m the year after. Monaco collected the final €35m in May 2022, taking the transfer total to up to €180m and making him the world's second-most expensive player.

Messi and the greatest transfer window of all time

Since then, Paris Saint-Germain have had to drastically reduce their spending on transfers due to budget constraints imposed by UEFA's Financial Fair Play. In the summer of 2019, they racked up a total of €106m in sales and dished out €95m in signings. This was the first time since QSI became club owners that PSG recorded a profit in the transfer market, boasting a €11m positive balance.

PSG still managed to splash out €50m on Argentine forward Mauro Icardi in 2020–21 and €60m on highly-rated Moroccan right-back Achraf Hakimi in 2021–22. In addition to Hakimi, the club registered the free transfers of six-time Ballon d'Or winner and Barcelona captain Lionel Messi, Real Madrid and Spain captain Sergio Ramos, UEFA Euro 2020 player of the tournament Gianluigi Donnarumma, and Netherlands captain Georginio Wijnaldum. Portuguese left-back Nuno Mendes, regarded as one of the best in his position, also arrived on an initial loan, which was made permanent in 2022 in a transfer worth €38 million. PSG's summer of 2021 has been described as the greatest transfer window of all time.

References

External links

Official websites
PSG.FR - Site officiel du Paris Saint-Germain
Paris Saint-Germain - Ligue 1
Paris Saint-Germain - UEFA.com

Paris Saint-Germain F.C.
Finance in France